The 2020 United States House of Representatives elections in Michigan was held on November 3, 2020, to elect the 14 U.S. representatives from the state of Michigan, one from each of the state's 14 congressional districts. The elections coincided with the 2020 U.S. presidential election, as well as other elections to the House of Representatives, elections to the United States Senate and various state and local elections. Party primaries were held on August 4, 2020. The Michigan delegation prior to the election consists of seven Democrats, six Republicans and one Libertarian. Unless otherwise indicated, the Cook Political Report rates the races as safe for the party of the incumbents.

Overview

Results of the 2020 United States House of Representatives elections in Michigan by district:

District 1

The 1st district covers the Upper Peninsula and the northern part of the Lower Peninsula. The incumbent is Republican Jack Bergman, who was re-elected with 56.3% of the vote in 2018.

Republican primary

Candidates

Nominee
Jack Bergman, incumbent U.S. Representative

Primary results

Democratic primary

Candidates

Nominee
Dana Ferguson, construction worker

Defeated in primary
Linda O'Dell, former Wall Street research analyst and trader

Primary results

Libertarian primary

Candidates

Declared
Ben Boren, vice chair of the Michigan Libertarian Party

General election

Predictions

Results

District 2

The 2nd district runs along the eastern shoreline of Lake Michigan taking in Lake, Muskegon, Oceana, Newaygo counties and parts of Mason County, and includes parts of the Grand Rapids suburbs, including Ottawa County and parts of Allegan and Kent counties. The incumbent is Republican Bill Huizenga, who was re-elected with 55.3% of the vote in 2018.

Republican primary

Candidates

Nominee
Bill Huizenga, incumbent U.S. Representative

Primary results

Democratic primary

Candidates

Nominee
Bryan Berghoef, United Church of Christ pastor

Primary results

Third parties

Declared
Jean-Michael Creviere (Green), activist

General election

Predictions

Polling

Results

District 3

The 3rd district is based in western Michigan, and is home to the city of Grand Rapids. The incumbent is Libertarian Justin Amash, who was re-elected as a Republican with 54.4% of the vote in 2018, and announced that he was leaving the party on July 4, 2019. Amash decided on July 16, 2020 not to seek re-election to his House seat.

Republican primary

Candidates

Nominee
Peter Meijer, U.S. Army veteran and grandson of Frederik Meijer

Defeated in primary
Lynn Afendoulis, state representative
 Joe Farrington, bar owner
Tom Norton, former village president and Afghanistan War veteran
Emily Rafi, attorney

Withdrew
Joel Langlois, businessman and president of the DeltaPlex Arena and Conference Center
Jim Lower, state representative

Declined
Jase Bolger, former Speaker of the Michigan House of Representatives
Brian Ellis, businessman and candidate for Michigan's 3rd congressional district in 2014

Endorsements

Polling

with Justin Amash and Jim Lower

Primary results

Democratic primary

Candidates

Nominee
Hillary Scholten, attorney

Failed to qualify
Amanda Brunzell, navy veteran

Withdrew
Doug Booth, healthcare operations manager
Nick Colvin, attorney
Emily Rafi, attorney (running as a Republican)

Declined
Cathy Albro, farmer and nominee for Michigan's 3rd congressional district in 2018

Endorsements

Primary results

Libertarian primary

Candidates

Declined
Justin Amash, incumbent U.S. Representative

General election

Predictions

Polling

with Lynn Afendoulis and Hillary Scholten

with Generic Republican and Generic Democrat

Results

District 4

The 4th district encompasses central Michigan, including Midland and Mount Pleasant. The incumbent is Republican John Moolenaar, who was re-elected with 62.6% of the vote in 2018.

Republican primary

Candidates

Nominee
John Moolenaar, incumbent U.S. Representative

Primary results

Democratic primary

Candidates

Nominee
Jerry Hilliard, teacher and nominee for this seat in 2018

Defeated in primary
Anthony Feig, Central Michigan University professor

Primary results

General election

Predictions

Results

District 5

The 5th district takes in the Saginaw Bay, including Bay City, Saginaw, and Flint. The incumbent is Democrat Dan Kildee, who was re-elected with 59.5% of the vote in 2018.

Democratic primary

Candidates

Nominee
Dan Kildee, incumbent U.S. Representative

Primary results

Republican primary

Candidates

Nominee
Tim Kelly, former state representative and former Saginaw County commissioner

Defeated in primary
Earl Lackie

Withdrew
Christina Fitchett-Hickson

Primary results

General election

Predictions

Results

District 6

The 6th district is based in southwest Michigan, including all of Berrien, Cass, Kalamazoo, St. Joseph, and Van Buren counties, as well as most of Allegan County. The incumbent is Republican Fred Upton, who was re-elected with 50.2% of the vote in 2018.

Republican primary

Candidates

Nominee
Fred Upton, incumbent U.S. Representative

Defeated in primary
Elena Oelke, real estate agent

Primary results

Democratic primary

Candidates

Nominee
Jon Hoadley, state representative

Defeated in primary
Jen Richardson, teacher

Declined
Matt Longjohn, physician and nominee for Michigan's 6th congressional district in 2018

Endorsements

Primary results

General election

Predictions

Polling

with Fred Upton and Jen Richardson

with generic Republican and generic Democrat

Results

District 7

The 7th district is based in southeast Michigan, taking in the western suburbs of Ann Arbor, Monroe County, as well as parts of Lansing in Eaton County. The incumbent is Republican Tim Walberg, who was re-elected with 53.8% of the vote in 2018.

Republican primary

Candidates

Nominee
Tim Walberg, incumbent U.S. Representative

Primary results

Democratic primary

Candidates

Nominee
Gretchen Driskell, former state representative, former mayor of Saline, and nominee for Michigan's 7th congressional district in 2016 and 2018

Failed to qualify
Samuel Branscum
Ryan Hall

Primary results

General election

Predictions

Results

District 8

The 8th district is based in southeast Michigan, including most of Lansing as well as Oakland County, including Rochester. The incumbent is Democrat Elissa Slotkin, who flipped the district and was elected with 50.6% of the vote in 2018. The Cook Political Report has rated this contest as 'lean Democratic'.

Democratic primary

Candidates

Nominee
Elissa Slotkin, incumbent U.S. Representative

Endorsements

Primary results

Republican primary

Candidates

Nominee
Paul Junge, former news anchor for FOX 47 News and former external affairs director at ICE

Eliminated in primary
Mike Detmer, businessman and former president of Young Republicans
Alan Hoover, U.S. Marine Corps veteran
Kristina Lyke, criminal defense attorney

Disqualified
Nikki Snyder, Michigan Department of Education board member and registered nurse

Declined
Tom Barrett, state senator
Mike Bishop, former U.S. Representative
Joe Hune, former state senator
Meghan Reckling, chair of the Livingston County Republican Party
Lana Theis, state senator

Primary results

Libertarian primary

Candidates

Declared
Joe Hartman, tax advisor

General election

Predictions

Results

District 9

The 9th district is centered around the northern suburbs of Detroit, taking in southeastern Oakland County and southern Macomb County, including the cities of Royal Oak and Warren. The incumbent is Democrat Andy Levin, who was elected with 59.7% of the vote in 2018.

Democratic primary

Candidates

Nominee
 Andy Levin, incumbent U.S Representative

Primary results

Republican primary

Candidate

Nominee
Charles Langworthy, U.S. Navy veteran

Defeated in primary
Gabi Grossbard, former cars salesman

Primary results

General election

Predictions

Results

District 10

The 10th district takes in the eastern Lower Peninsula region known as the Thumb, consisting of Huron County, Lapeer County, St. Clair County, and Sanilac County as well as most of northern Macomb County and eastern Tuscola County. The incumbent is Republican Paul Mitchell, who was re-elected with 60.8% of the vote in 2018, and subsequently announced he would not seek re-election on July 24, 2019 over health issues.

Republican primary

Candidates

Nominee
Lisa McClain, finance executive

Defeated in primary
Shane Hernandez, state representative
Doug Slocum, retired Brigadier general

Failed to qualify
Brandon Mikula
Richard Piwko
Bisham Singh

Declined
Kevin Daley, state senator
Dan Lauwers, state senator
Pete Lucido, state senator
Pete Lund, former state representative
Mike MacDonald, state senator
Candice Miller, Macomb County Public Works Commissioner and former U.S. Representative
Paul Mitchell, incumbent U.S. Representative
Phil Pavlov, state senator and candidate for Michigan's 10th congressional district in 2016

Endorsements

Polling

Primary results

Democratic primary

Candidates

Nominee
Kimberly Bizon, nominee for Michigan's 10th congressional district in 2018

Defeated in primary
 Kelly Noland, U.S. Army veteran and former nurse

Failed to qualify
 Don Wellington, former Treasury Department policy advisor

Primary results

General election

Predictions

Endorsements

Results

District 11

The 11th district is situated northwest of Detroit, comprising portions of northwestern Wayne and southwestern Oakland counties. The incumbent is Democrat Haley Stevens, who flipped the district and was elected with 51.8% of the vote in 2018.

Democratic primary

Candidates

Nominated
Haley Stevens, incumbent U.S. Representative

Primary results

Republican primary

Candidates

Nominee
Eric Esshaki, attorney

Defeated in primary
Frank Acosta, businessman
Kerry Bentivolio, former U.S. Representative (2013–2015)
Carmelita Greco, entrepreneur
Whittney Williams, auto show product specialist and former model

Failed to qualify
Scott Keller

Primary results

Endorsements

General election

Predictions

Results

District 12

The 12th district, under its current borders, is located in the southeastern region of the lower peninsula, stretching from Detroit's western suburbs to Ann Arbor. It includes portions of Washtenaw and Wayne counties. The incumbent is Democrat Debbie Dingell, who was re-elected with 68.1% of the vote in 2018.

Democratic primary

Candidates

Nominee
 Debbie Dingell, incumbent U.S. Representative

Defeated in primary
 Solomon Rajput, medical student and founding member of the Michigan Resistance

Withdrawn
 Anthony Carbonaro, small business owner and convict

Endorsements

Primary results

Republican primary

Candidates

Nominee
 Jeff Jones, nominee for Michigan's 12th congressional district in 2016 and 2018

Primary results

General election

Predictions

Results

District 13

The 13th district is located entirely within Wayne County, including parts of western Detroit and its suburbs. The incumbent is Democrat Rashida Tlaib, who was elected with 84.2% of the vote in 2018 without major-party opposition.

Democratic primary

Candidates

Nominee
Rashida Tlaib, incumbent U.S. Representative

Defeated in primary
Brenda Jones, former U.S. Representative and President of the Detroit City Council

Declined
Sharon McPhail, former Detroit city councilwoman
Benny Napoleon, Wayne County sheriff

Endorsements

Polling

Primary results

Republican primary

Candidates

Nominee
 David Dudenhoefer, district chair for the 13th Congressional District Republican Committee

Defeated in primary
 Linda Sawyer, nurse
 Al Lemmo, retired engineer

Primary results

General election

Predictions

Results

District 14

The 14th district spans from eastern Detroit to Pontiac, taking in Farmington Hills and Southfield. The incumbent is Democrat Brenda Lawrence, who was re-elected with 80.9% in 2018.

Democratic primary

Candidate

Nominee
Brenda Lawrence, incumbent U.S. Representative

Defeated in primary
Terrance Morrison, retired Detroit public works official and candidate for Michigan's 14th congressional district in 2016

Primary results

Republican primary

Candidates

Nominee
Robert Patrick, building contractor

Defeated in primary
Daryle F. Houston

Primary results

General election

Predictions

Results

See also
 2020 Michigan elections

Notes

Partisan clients

References

External links
  (State affiliate of the U.S. League of Women Voters)
 
 
 
 

Official campaign websites for 1st district candidates
 Jack Bergman (R) for Congress
 Dana Ferguson (D) for Congress

Official campaign websites for 2nd district candidates
 Bryan Berghoef (D) for Congress 
 Jean-Michael Creviere (G) for Congress
 Bill Huizenga (R) for Congress

Official campaign websites for 3rd district candidates
 Peter Meijer (R) for Congress
 Hillary Scholten (D) for Congress 

Official campaign websites for 4th district candidates
 Jerry Hilliard (D) for Congress
 John Moolenaar (R) for Congress

Official campaign websites for 5th district candidates
 Tim Kelly (R) for Congress 
 Dan Kildee (D) for Congress

Official campaign websites for 6th district candidates
 Jon Hoadley (D) for Congress
 Fred Upton (R) for Congress

Official campaign websites for 7th district candidates
 Gretchen Driskell (D) for Congress
 Tim Walberg (R) for Congress

Official campaign websites for 8th district candidates
 Paul Junge (R) for Congress
 Elissa Slotkin (D) for Congress

Official campaign websites for 9th district candidates
 Charles Langworthy (R) for Congress 
 Andy Levin (D) for Congress

Official campaign websites for 10th district candidates
 Kimberly Bizon (D) for Congress
 Lisa McClain (R) for Congress

Official campaign websites for 11th district candidates
 Eric Esshaki (R) for Congress
 Haley Stevens (D) for Congress

Official campaign websites for 12th district candidates
 Debbie Dingell (D) for Congress

Official campaign websites for 13th district candidates
 David Dudenhoefer (R) for Congress
 Rashida Tlaib (D) for Congress

Official campaign websites for 14th district candidates
 Brenda Lawrence (D) for Congress
 Robert Patrick (R) for Congress

Michigan
2020
United States House of Representatives